Wolfgang Franz Danspeckgruber (born February 4, 1956) is the Founding Director of the Liechtenstein Institute on Self-Determination at Princeton University and has been teaching on issues of state, international security, self-determination, diplomacy, and crisis diplomacy at Princeton's Woodrow Wilson School of Public and International Affairs and the Department of Politics since 1988.  He is also founder and chair of the Liechtenstein Colloquium on European and International Affairs, LCM, a private diplomacy forum.

Education
Danspeckgruber was educated at the Johannes Kepler University of Linz and the University of Vienna, Austria, (D.Laws); and at the Graduate Institute of International and Development Studies, Geneva, Switzerland (Ph.D.) where he studied under the supervision of Curt Gasteyger, and worked closely with Dusan Sidjanski at the University of Geneva.

Following his Austrian military service (First Lieutenant, Reserve), he served as Special Assistant to the Commander of the Austrian National Defense Academy. Danspeckgruber was a visiting scholar at the Fletcher School of Law and Diplomacy, and held research fellowships at the Belfer Center of Science and International Affairs at the John F. Kennedy School of Government at Harvard University, Recipient of Erwin Schroedinger Fellowship, and at Princeton's Center of International Studies where he worked closely with Robert Gilpin.

Career
Wolfgang Danspeckgruber was instrumental in the creation of the Liechtenstein Institute on Self-Determination at Princeton University, LISD, in 2000, which has been endowed by Prince Hans-Adam II, Prince of Liechtenstein. He is interested in self-determination, security and stability in the wider Middle East, Caucasus, Afghanistan, and Central Asia; in theory and practice of international diplomacy; crisis- and private diplomacy, and negotiations, the International Criminal Court, ICC; as well as in issues concerning religion and diplomacy. In 2007 Danspeckgruber created the Program on Religion, Diplomacy, and International Relations, PORDIR, together with Paul Raushenbush.

During Austria's Membership in the United Nations Security Council (2008–10), Danspeckgruber served as adviser to its Permanent Mission in New York. He has also advised the Permanent Mission of Liechtenstein to the United Nations in New York and has worked with Ambassador Christian Wenaweser. In 2006, during Austria's Presidency of the European Union, he was the academic adviser to the Permanent Mission of Austria to the United Nations in New York.

In 1992 to 1999, Danspeckgruber was involved in private diplomacy in Southeastern Europe and has also worked with the Ahtisaari Team and the EU Special Representative on the status of Kosovo. Recently, Danspeckgruber has been studying Syria and searching for ways to establish peace and stability in the region. He has emphasized the necessity for a negotiated solution in the Syrian conflict to stop the fighting and radicalization, to protect women and children, and respect all beliefs and religions. Statement of the Holy See Meeting of Experts on Syria

Interests and expertise
Danspeckgruber is interested in the analysis of international relations, self-determination, in the conduct of diplomacy, mediation, reconciliation, and the management of international crises – particularly also the role of perception, technology, religion and values. He works to educate and train the next generation of leaders, men and women, in those dimensions.

Danspeckgruber co-taught graduate and undergraduate seminars on the European Union and international affairs with Jose Manuel Barroso; international crisis diplomacy with Joschka Fischer and also with Robert Finn; and on diplomacy and Afghanistan with Francesc Vendrell at the Woodrow Wilson School of Public and International Affairs. Danspeckgruber has also been teaching international relations and crisis diplomacy at the European Forum Alpbach, Austria.

Discussing contemporary variants of self-determination-crises, Danspeckgruber argues that "[t]here is a growing sense that self-determination and autonomy ought not necessarily and automatically cause the break up of sovereign states. Rather, at least in most cases, there is increasing interest in the introduction of self-governance - the maximization of autonomy - and further decentralization." "The Arab Spring, and many of the other intrastate crises we face today demonstrate the critical meaning of 'determining one's destiny'.", Danspeckgruber in Joerg Fisch, The world divided. Self-Determination and the Right of Peoples to Self-Determination, Oldenbourg, 2011.

Publications
Danspeckgruber's publications include "The Self-Determination of Peoples: Community, Nation, and State in an Interdependent World", and "Working Toward Peace and Prosperity in Afghanistan", [Lynne Rienner Publishers]; "Globalization - Reflections on Impact and Dichotomies" in Carl Baudenbacher, Erhard Busek, eds., "Aspekte der Globalisierung",  2008; "Self-Governance Plus Regional Integration: A Possible Solution to Self-Determination Claims" in Stefan Wolff and Marc Weller, eds. "Autonomy, Self-Governance, and Conflict Resolution", 2005; and "The EEA, the Neutrals, and an Emerging Architecture" in Gregory F. Treverton, ed. "The Shape of the New Europe", 1992.

He is the editor of the "LISD Summary Report" and the "LISD Policy Brief", the "LISD Study Series", and the "Encyclopedia Princetoniensis: The Princeton Encyclopedia of Self-Determination".

Books
 Danspeckgruber, Wolfgang F., ed., "Robert Gilpin and International Relations: Reflections", Lynne Rienner Publishers, 2012.
 Danspeckgruber, Wolfgang F., ed., "Working Toward Peace and Prosperity in Afghanistan", Lynne Rienner Publishers, 2011.
 Danspeckgruber, Wolfgang F., Stefan Barriga and Christian Wenaweser, eds. "The Princeton Process on the Crime of Aggression: Materials of the Special Working Group on the Crime of Aggression, 2003-2009", Lynne Rienner Publishers, 2009.
 Danspeckgruber, Wolfgang F., with Robert Finn, eds. "Building State and Security in Afghanistan", with contributions by President Hamid Karzai and Hans Adam II, Prince of Liechtenstein, Princeton: Liechtenstein Institute on Self-Determination at Princeton University, Woodrow Wilson School of Public and International Affairs, 2007.
 Danspeckgruber, Wolfgang F., ed. "Perspectives on the Russian State in Transition". Princeton: Liechtenstein Institute on Self-Determination at Princeton University, Woodrow Wilson School of Public and International Affairs, 2006.
 Danspeckgruber, Wolfgang F., ed. "The Self-Determination of Peoples: Community, Nation, and State in an Interdependent World", Boulder, Colorado: Lynne Rienner Publishers, 2002.
 Danspeckgruber, Wolfgang F., with Arthur Watts, eds. "Self-Determination and Self-Administration: A Sourcebook", Foreword Hans Adam II, Prince of Liechtenstein, Boulder: Lynne Rienner Publishers, 1997.
 Danspeckgruber, Wolfgang F., with Charles R.H. Tripp, eds. "The Iraqi Aggression against Kuwait: Strategic Lessons and Implications for Europe". Boulder, Colorado: Westview Press, 1996.
 Danspeckgruber, Wolfgang F., ed. "Emerging Dimensions of European Security Policy". Boulder: Westview Press, 1991.

References

External links
 Wolfgang F. Danspeckgruber's Biography via Liechtenstein Institute on Self-Determination (LISD) Website
 Wolfgang F. Danspeckgruber's Biography via Woodrow Wilson School of Public and International Affairs at Princeton University
 Official Website for Liechtenstein Institute on Self-Determination (LISD) at Princeton University
 Liechtenstein Institute Publications
 Wolfgang F. Danspeckgruber on Huffington Post
 Danspeckgruber, Wolfgang F., "Self-Governance Plus Regional Integration: A Solution to Self-Determination or Secession Claims in the Emerging International System"
 Brett Tomlinson, "Everything on the Table", Princeton Alumni Weekly (PAW) January 24, 2007: Real-world Diplomacy Comes to the Classroom with Former German Foreign Minister Joschka Fischer and Lecturer Wolfgang Danspeckgruber
 P.G. Sittenfield, "When the Professor is a Tough Grader, and Your Dad", New York Times, May 10, 2006.
 Official Facebook Page for Wolfgang F. Danspeckgruber
 Official Facebook Page for the Liechtenstein Institute on Self-Determination (LISD)
 Official Twitter Page for the Liechtenstein Institute on Self-Determination (LISD)

Living people
Austrian academics
University of Vienna alumni
Graduate Institute of International and Development Studies alumni
Harvard Kennedy School staff
Princeton University staff
1956 births
Johannes Kepler University Linz alumni